Meligramma is a genus of hoverflies in the subfamily Syrphinae.

Species
M. cingulatum (Egger, 1860)
M. guttatum (Fallén, 1817)
M. triangulifera (Zetterstedt, 1843)
M. vespertinum (Vockeroth, 1980)

References

Diptera of Europe
Hoverfly genera
Syrphinae
Syrphini